Mohammad Abu Al-Awad Al-Shuaibat (12 February 1939 – 20 December 2012) was a Jordanian footballer. A previous legendary player and coach for Al-Faisaly (Amman) and the Jordan national football team.

Career and History
Mohammad Awad is considered to be the biggest star and legend in the history of Jordanian football. His funeral had taken place the day after his death, on December 21; currently buried in an Islamic graveyard at Sahab.
 
He is the first Jordanian football player to score on Egypt in a match between Jordan and Egypt held at the Amman International Stadium in 1968. That match had ended with a big defeat for the hosts, 6-1.  

He is the first player to have a match to mark his retirement, in 1972 at the Amman International Stadium in a match between his team Al-Faisaly and Al-Amen Al-Aam, sponsored by Prince Ra'ad. And until he retired, he did not lose any tournament with his club Al-Faisaly. He won the Jordan league ten times as a player with his club Al-Faisaly.

When he first began coaching his national team Jordan, he became an assistant coach serving the German Joseph Shtigr, then the Scottish Danny McLennan, and lastly the English coach Tony Banville. Later in 1991, Awad himself became head coach of Jordan.

He is the first coach to attain achievements for his national team Jordan; between 1992 and 1999, when he first helped his country Jordan win the Jordan International tournament of 1992 and both tournaments of the Pan Arab Games, starting 1997 in Beirut and 1999 in Amman.

He participated in several training sessions were the first in 1974 and continued without interruption, where he was keen to develop himself as a coach where he participated in training courses held in Brazil, Germany, Scotland and Malaysia in Qatar and the UAE under the supervision of both the Asian and Arab federations.

Achievements and Participation in International Tournaments

As a player
1961 Pan Arab Games
1965 Pan Arab Games
1963 Arab Nations Cup
1964 Arab Nations Cup
1966 Arab Nations Cup

As a coach
With Al-Faisaly (Amman) 
Jordan League 6 times
Jordan FA Cup 3 times
Jordan FA Shield 1 time
Jordan Super Cup 1 time

With Jordan
1992 Jordan International Tournament
1997 Pan Arab Games
1999 Pan Arab Games

References

 

 

1939 births
2012 deaths
Jordanian footballers
Jordan international footballers
Jordanian football managers
Jordan national football team managers
Al-Faisaly SC players
Sportspeople from Amman
Al-Faisaly SC managers
Jordanian Pro League managers
Association football midfielders